William Christopher Barrett (1913–1992) was a professor of philosophy at New York University from 1950 to 1979.

Biography
Precociously, Barrett began post-secondary studies at the City College of New York when 15 years old. He received his PhD at Columbia University.  He was an editor of Partisan Review and later the literary critic of The Atlantic Monthly magazine. Barrett wrote philosophical works for nonexperts, including Irrational Man and The Illusion of Technique, which remain in print.

Like many intellectuals of his generation, Barrett flirted with Marxism before turning his energies to providing readable introductions to European philosophical schools, notably existentialism.

Barrett was good friends with the poet Delmore Schwartz for many years. He knew many other literary figures of the day, including Edmund Wilson, Philip Rahv, and Albert Camus.  He was deeply influenced by the philosophies of Friedrich Nietzsche, Søren Kierkegaard, and Martin Heidegger and was the editor of D. T. Suzuki's 1956 classic Zen Buddhism.  In fiction his taste ran to the great Russians, particularly Fyodor Dostoyevsky.

Barrett died in 1992, aged 78, of cancer of the esophagus.

Barrett's Law is named for him: "not everyone who might read the productions of scholarly writers is an expert in the fields discussed" (p. 99).

Books
What Is Existentialism? (1947), Partisan Review, 1964 Random House edition: 
Irrational Man: A Study in Existential Philosophy (1958), Doubleday, Anchor Books paperback (1962): 
Philosophy in the Twentieth Century (1962), four volumes, William Barrett and Henry D. Aiken, editors, Random House
Time of Need: Forms of Imagination in the Twentieth Century (1972), Harper Bros. 
The Illusion of Technique: A Search for Meaning in a Technological Civilization (1979), Doubleday, 
The Truants: Adventures Among the Intellectuals (1982), a memoir, Doubleday, 
Death of the Soul: From Descartes to the Computer (1986), Doubleday,

See also
American philosophy
List of American philosophers
List of philosophers
New York University Department of Philosophy

References

External links

 at Anova.org.

City College of New York alumni
Columbia University alumni
New York University faculty
1913 births
1992 deaths
20th-century American philosophers